The 1906 Haskell Indians football team was an American football team that represented the Haskell Indian Institute (now known as Haskell Indian Nations University) as an independent during the 1906 college football season. In its second and final season under head coach John H. Outland, Haskell compiled a 2–5 record and was outscored by a total of 96 to 53. Coach Outland was later inducted into the College Football Hall of Fame and is the namesake of the Outland Trophy.

Schedule

References

Haskell
Haskell Indian Nations Fighting Indians football seasons
Haskell Indians football